Sarah Vaughan with Michel Legrand is a 1972 studio album by Sarah Vaughan, arranged by Michel Legrand.

The ten songs on the original LP album were composed by Legrand with lyrics by Alan and Marilyn Bergman. Some reissues have included two bonus tracks arranged and conducted by Legrand but composed by others.

Legrand won the Grammy Award for Best Instrumental Arrangement Accompanying Vocalist(s) at the 15th Annual Grammy Awards for his arrangement of "What Are You Doing the Rest of Your Life?".

Reception

The Allmusic review by Ron Wynn awarded the album three stars and said that the album was "a meeting that worked better than anyone might expect. Vaughan was still her dynamic, charismatic vocal self, while Legrand didn't obscure or dilute her singing, and also effectively supported her in his own way".

Track listing
 "The Summer Knows (Theme from Summer of '42)" - 3:03
 "What Are You Doing the Rest of Your Life?" - 3:56
 "Once You've Been in Love" - 3:14
 "Hands of Time (Brian's Song)" - 3:06
 "I Was Born in Love with You" - 3:08
 "I Will Say Goodbye" - 2:11
 "Summer Me, Winter Me" - 2:47
 "His Eyes, Her Eyes" - 3:23
 "Pieces of Dreams" - 3:08
 "Blue, Green, Grey and Gone" - 4:15
 "Wave" (Antônio Carlos Jobim) - 3:30
 "Deep in the Night" (Helen Miller, Eve Merriam) - 3:18

All music composed by Michel Legrand, with all lyrics written by Alan and Marilyn Bergman, other writers noted.

Personnel
Sarah Vaughan - vocals
Pete Christlieb, Bob Cooper, Bernard Fleischer, Bill Hood, Jerome Richardson, Bud Shank - flute, reeds (multiple)
Vincent DeRosa, Bill Hinshaw, Sinclair Lott, Dick Macker, Arthur Maebe, Richard Perissi, George Price, Ralph Pyle - French horn
Bobby Knight, Charles Loper, Grover Mitchell, George Roberts, Frank Rosolino, Lloyd Ulyate - trombone
Al Aarons, Gary Barone, Conte Candoli, Buddy Childers, Chuck Findley - trumpet
Tommy Johnson - tuba
Dave Grusin, Arthur Kane, Mike Wofford - keyboards
Larry Bunker - percussion
Tommy Tedesco - guitar
Chuck Rainey - bass guitar
Chuck Berghofer, Ray Brown, Bob Magnusson - double bass
John Guerin, Shelly Manne - drums
Michel Legrand - arranger, conductor, piano

References

Mainstream Records albums
Albums arranged by Michel Legrand
Albums conducted by Michel Legrand
Albums produced by Bob Shad
Sarah Vaughan albums
1972 albums